C. baileyi may refer to:

Callitris baileyi, a species of conifer
Chaetodipus baileyi, or Bailey's pocket mouse
Charaxes baileyi, a species of butterfly
Conasprella baileyi, a species of sea snail
Crenichthys baileyi, the White River springfish
Crocidura baileyi, or Bailey's shrew

See also
Baileyi (disambiguation)